Island Lake South is a summer village in Alberta, Canada. It is located on the southern shore of Island Lake, along Highway 2, northwest of Athabasca.

Demographics 

In the 2016 Census of Population conducted by Statistics Canada, the Summer Village of Island Lake South had a population of 61 living in 30 of its 74 total private dwellings, a  change from its 2011 population of 72.

See also 
List of communities in Alberta
List of summer villages in Alberta
List of resort villages in Saskatchewan

References

External links 

1958 establishments in Alberta
Summer villages in Alberta